O'Connor's GAC Glack is a Gaelic Athletic Association club based in the Glack/Ballykelly area in County Londonderry, Northern Ireland. The club is a member of Derry GAA and currently caters for Gaelic football and Camogie.

Underage teams up to U-12's play in North Derry league and championships, from U-14 upwards teams compete in All-Derry competitions. Glack have won the Derry Intermediate Football Championship once and the Derry Junior Football Championship three times.

Gaelic football
Glack fields Gaelic football teams at Under-8, Under-10, Under-12, Under-14, Under-16, Minor, Reserve and Senior levels. The Senior team competes in the Derry Junior Football Championship and Division 2 of the Derry ACFL.

Camogie
The camogie club is called St Finlough’s Camogie Club Glack and fields teams at various age-groups. Notably, Glack is the home club of Junior All-Ireland crowned camogie player and captain Brigid Carmichael (née McLaughlin)

History
The club was founded in 1921. One of the club's major honours came in 1971 when it won the Derry Minor Football Championship. They won the Derry Junior Football Championship a year later before winning the Derry Intermediate Football Championship in 1974. After dropping back down to Junior grade, Glack won the Derry Junior Championship for a second time in 1981. In 2019 the club won their third Derry Junior Championship defeating Drum to end a 39 year wait for a County Championship.

Honours

Senior
 Derry Intermediate Football Championship: 1
 1974
 Derry Junior Football Championship: 3
 1972, 1981, 2019
 H&A Mechanical Services Division 3: 1
 2012
 Neal Carlin Cup: 3
 2014, 2016, 2019

Minor
Derry Minor Football Championship: 1
1971

Under-16
 Derry Under-16 Football Championship: 4
 1971, 1972, 1973, 1974

Note: The above lists may be incomplete. Please add any other honours you know of.

See also
Derry Intermediate Football Championship
List of Gaelic games clubs in Derry

External links
O'Connor's GFC and St Finlough's CC website
Glack GAA – Home of O'Connors & St. Finloughs

References

Gaelic games clubs in County Londonderry
Gaelic football clubs in County Londonderry